The Caledonian Railway 812 and 652 Classes were 0-6-0 steam tender locomotives designed by John F. McIntosh for the Caledonian Railway and introduced in 1899. They had the same boiler type as the 721 “Dunalastair” Class 4-4-0s. They could reach speeds of up to 55 mph (89 km/h).

Construction 
96 locomotives were built, as follows:

Seventeen were fitted with the Westinghouse air brakes for passenger train working, including the only surviving engine of the class, No. 828.
All 96 passed to the London, Midland and Scottish Railway at the 1923 grouping. Only three, 17567, 17598 and 17610 (all 812s), had been withdrawn by the time of nationalisation in 1948. The last locomotive in service was not withdrawn until 1963.

Preservation 

Locomotive 828 (LMS 17566, BR 57566) is the sole survivor of the class and is an important example of Scottish industrial heritage. It is based at the Strathspey Railway. It was returned to regular service in 2010 and then again in March 2017 following heavy repairs. 828 is the final member of the first batch of engines built in 1899.

Belgian derivatives 

Belgian State Railways (SNCB-NMBS) derived three series of steam locomotives (891 units) from the class 812 between 1899 and 1914. They had a shallower firebox, able to burn semi-bituminous coal and briquettes, allowing a shorter wheelbase due to its positioning above the rear axle. There were three classes
Type 30 – first variant with several details in common with the Caledonian engines (cab windows, gauges and tender coupling). 82 built between 1899 and 1901.
Type 32 (later renamed Type 44) – more powerful and fitted with a Belgian cab, higher steam pressure, new gauges and tender coupling. 502 built between 1901 and 1910
 (later renamed Type 41) – same features but improved with a Schmidt superheater. 307 built between 1905 and 1914
Until 1909, they were the only new engines used with freight trains. They were also used on suburban and local passenger trains and some expresses on hilly sections.
Most of them were retired between 1947 and 1959. Some of them were then used as stationary boilers and two of them (44.221 and 41.195) survive in museums. A third one (44.021), kept as a parts donor, was cut up for scrap in 2002.

References

See also 

 Locomotives of the Caledonian Railway

External links 

 The Caley 828 Overhaul Website
 Rail UK database 812 and 652 Classes

812
0-6-0 locomotives
Dübs locomotives
Neilson locomotives
Sharp Stewart locomotives
Railway locomotives introduced in 1899
Standard gauge steam locomotives of Great Britain